Langsdorfia garleppi is a moth in the family Cossidae.

References

Natural History Museum Lepidoptera generic names catalog

Hypoptinae